Pavel Medynský (born 28 October 1964) is a Czech football manager, who managed Bohemians 1905 in the 2011–12 Czech First League.

He joined Bohemians 1905 in 2008 as assistant coach and was promoted in May 2011, when he was announced as the new manager, replacing the outgoing Pavel Hoftych. Although Bohemians made a good start to the 2011–12 Czech First League, reaching second place, the team subsequently went on a poor run of form, scoring just four times in nine matches and the club were just five points clear of the relegation zone when Medynský was relieved of his duties in March 2012.

References

External links
 Profile at idnes.cz 

1964 births
Living people
Czechoslovak footballers
Czech footballers
Czech football managers
Czech First League managers
FK Čáslav managers
Bohemians 1905 managers

Association footballers not categorized by position
Czech National Football League managers
SK Slavia Prague (women) managers